Fazle Shakoor Khan is a Pakistani politician hailing from Charsadda who has been a member of the Khyber Pakhtunkhwa Assembly from August 2018 till January 2023. He belongs to the Pakistan Tehreek-e-Insaf. He is also serving as member the different committees. He was appointed as Minister for Law and Parliamentary Affairs and Human Rights by Chief Minister Mahmood Khan on 20 May 2021.

Political career
Khan was elected as the member of the Khyber Pakhtunkhwa Assembly on ticket of Jamiat Ulema-e-Islam (F) from PK-17 Charsadda-I in 2013 Pakistani general election. He is also served as member of the Khyber Pakhtunkhwa Assembly from 2008 to 2013 in 2008 Pakistani general election on the ticket of Awami National Party. Khan was elected as the member of the Khyber Pakhtunkhwa Assembly on ticket of Pakistan Tehreek Insaf from PK-59 Charsadda-I in Pakistani election 2018.

References

Living people
Pashtun people
Jamiat Ulema-e-Islam (F) politicians
Khyber Pakhtunkhwa MPAs 2013–2018
People from Charsadda District, Pakistan
1976 births
Pakistan Tehreek-e-Insaf MPAs (Khyber Pakhtunkhwa)